Arhytinus is a genus of beetles in the family Carabidae, first described by Henry Walter Bates in 1889.

Species 
Arhytinus contains the following fifty species:

 Arhytinus angustibasis Baehr & Schmidt, 2010
 Arhytinus angustimargo Baehr, 2010
 Arhytinus atripennis Baehr, 2012
 Arhytinus baliensis Baehr, 2012
 Arhytinus bembidioides Bates, 1889
 Arhytinus borcherdingi Baehr, 2010
 Arhytinus brendelli Baehr & Schmidt, 2010
 Arhytinus celebensis Baehr, 2010
 Arhytinus circumcinctus Baehr, 2010
 Arhytinus cordicollis Baehr, 2010
 Arhytinus crenulipennis Baehr, 2010
 Arhytinus darlingtoni Baehr, 2012
 Arhytinus flavomarginatus Baehr, 2014
 Arhytinus frater Baehr, 2010
 Arhytinus gerdi Baehr & Schmidt, 2010
 Arhytinus gerstmeieri Baehr, 2016
 Arhytinus granum Darlington, 1952
 Arhytinus hammondi Baehr & Schmidt, 2010
 Arhytinus harpago Baehr, 2010
 Arhytinus inarmatus Baehr, 2010
 Arhytinus indicus Baehr, 2010
 Arhytinus irideus Jedlicka, 1936
 Arhytinus javanus Baehr, 2012
 Arhytinus leytensis Baehr & Schmidt, 2010
 Arhytinus lieftincki Louwerens, 1951
 Arhytinus lorenzi Baehr, 2010
 Arhytinus ludewigi Baehr, 2012
 Arhytinus major Darlington, 1952
 Arhytinus maximus Baehr, 2014
 Arhytinus medius Darlington, 1952
 Arhytinus minimus Jedlicka, 1936
 Arhytinus minor Baehr, 2010
 Arhytinus missai Baehr, 2010
 Arhytinus moluccensis Baehr, 2010
 Arhytinus multispinosus Baehr, 2010
 Arhytinus nepalensis Baehr & Schmidt, 2010
 Arhytinus nitescens Baehr, 2010
 Arhytinus nitidipennis Baehr, 2010
 Arhytinus novaeirlandiae Baehr, 2010
 Arhytinus philippinus Jedlicka, 1936
 Arhytinus piceus Jedlicka, 1936
 Arhytinus punctibasis Baehr, 2018
 Arhytinus riedeli Baehr, 2010
 Arhytinus sumatrensis Baehr, 2010
 Arhytinus taiwanensis Baehr, 2010
 Arhytinus timorensis Baehr, 2017
 Arhytinus unispinus Baehr, 2010
 Arhytinus vietnamensis Baehr, 2014
 Arhytinus weigeli Baehr, 2014
 Arhytinus yunnanus Baehr, 2012

References

Platyninae